Kelvinside Academy is an independent day school in Glasgow, Scotland, founded in 1878. It has a capacity of over 600 pupils and spans two years of Nursery, six years of Junior School (primary school), a transition year of Senior Preparatory, and six years of Senior School (secondary school), comprising fifteen years in all. Kelvinside was founded as a private school and remained so until the late 1940s when, like many similar schools, it became 'grant-aided' until 1985 when it reverted to its fully independent roots once more. Formerly for boys only, the school became fully co-educational in 1998.

The School

Kelvinside Academy is in the Kelvinside area of the north of Glasgow, near the Glasgow Botanic Gardens. It has a large main building, which is category A listed and was designed by James Sellars, with some modern additions. The original building was opened on 2 September 1878 and cost £21,698 11s; this included the construction of both roads and sewers.

The School crest shows Minerva with the motto ΑΙΕΝ ΑΡΙΣΤΕΥΕΙΝ which translates as "Ever To Be The Best". This has also been given a "modern" translation of "The Best You Can Be". Minerva appears prominently in carved stone above the main entrance, and in a bronze medallion set in the perimeter wall. Unlike many of the surrounding buildings, the School retains much of its original cast iron fences despite the metal shortages during the Second World War.

There is a well-established house system, which divides all the pupils into four different houses, each represented by a colour: red for Stewart House, yellow for Buchanan House, green for MacGregor House and blue for Colquhoun.

The School opened a new Nursery at its Balgray Campus in August 2013.

In 2018, Kelvinside merged with Craigholme School to form the Glasgow Schools Trust, which was created to share resources between both schools and preserve both schools due to falling pupil numbers.

Notable alumni and staff

 John Joy Bell, journalist and author
 Robert Browning, Byzantinist
 Brigadier General John Charteris
 Sir Hugh Fraser, 2nd Baronet, of the House of Fraser department store chain (1936–1987)
 Richie Gray, Scottish International Rugby Union player currently playing for Glasgow Warriors
 Brigadier Alastair Pearson, Parachute Regiment, DSO***, MC
 Air Vice Marshal Sandy Johnstone
 James Broom Millar – first Director General of the Ghana Broadcasting Corporation (1954–1960)
 Boyd Muir, EVP & CFO, President of Operations, Universal Music Group 
 Ian Livingston, Baron Livingston of Parkhead
 Sir George Macdonald, archaeologist, teacher at the school 1887–1892
 Sir Donald MacDougall, economist
 Donald Orr, cricketer
 Alan Rodger, Baron Rodger of Earlsferry (1944–2011)
 Craig Wright, cricketer.
 Sandy Wylie, Lord Kinclaven, Judge of the Supreme Courts
 Scott Cummings, Scottish International Rugby Union player currently playing for Glasgow Warriors
 Douglas Gairdner, paediatrician
 Rennie Keith, cricketer
 Lorne Crerar Chair and founding partner Harper Macleod Professor of Banking Law University of Glasgow
 Colin Neill Former President Cricket Scotland, Current Chairman of The Forty Club

Related publications
 Kelvinside Academy, 1878–1978 by Colin Mackay
 Kelvinside Academy, 1878–1923 by William Brodie
 Kelvinside Academy, 1878–1928 by David Morrice Low
 Minerva, termly newsletter

References

External links
 Kelvinside Academy
 ISCis page for Kelvinside Academy
 Friends Reunited page for Kelvinside Academy (registration required)
 Kelvinside Academical Club
 Kelvinside Academy's page on Scottish Schools Online

Sources

 http://pmsa.courtauld.ac.uk/pmsa/GW/KS-002.htm
 https://archive.today/20130421040234/http://www.schoolsguidebook.co.uk/schools/Kelvinside_Academy.html

School buildings completed in 1878
Category A listed buildings in Glasgow
Educational institutions established in 1878
Member schools of the Headmasters' and Headmistresses' Conference
Private schools in Glasgow
James Sellars buildings
 
1878 establishments in Scotland